George William Schmal (21 February 1849 - 4 August 1923) was a blacksmith in the United States Army who was awarded the Presidential Medal of Honor for gallantry during the American Civil War. Schmal was awarded the medal on 3 May 1865 for actions performed during the Battle of Paines Crossroads on 5 April 1865.

Personal life 
Schmal was born in Germany on 21 February 1849. He fathered one known child, Frank Peter Schmal (1873-1960). Schmal died in Erie County, New York on 4 August 1923 and was buried in Forest Lawn Cemetery in Buffalo, New York.

Military service 
Schmal enlisted in the Army as a blacksmith on 8 March 1865 in Buffalo. He was assigned to Company M of the 24th New York Cavalry, which was renamed the 1st New York Provincial Cavalry on 17 June 1865. On 5 April 1865, during the Battle of Paines Crossroads in Virginia, Schmal captured an unspecified Confederate battle flag. For this action, he was awarded the Medal of Honor.

Schmal's Medal of Honor citation reads:

Schmal was mustered out of the Army on 19 July 1865 at Cloud's Mills, Virginia.

References 

1849 births
1923 deaths
19th-century American military personnel
American blacksmiths
People from Buffalo, New York
American Civil War recipients of the Medal of Honor